Dugdale Stratford Dugdale (1773–1836) was a Member of Parliament for Warwickshire from 1802 to 1831.

Early life
Dugdale Stratford Dugdale was the first surviving son of Richard Geast (later Dugdale), barrister, of Blythe Hall, by Penelope Bate Stratford, the daughter of Francis Stratford of Merevale Hall.

Political career
Dugdale was returned unopposed for the constituency of Warwickshire in 1802, which he went on to serve for 29 years.

Personal life
On 27 June 1799 he married Hon. Charlotte Curzon (d. 30 Dec. 1832), daughter of Assheton Curzon, 1st Viscount Curzon, with whom he had a son, the Conservative MP William Stratford Dugdale

References

1773 births
1836 deaths
Members of the Parliament of the United Kingdom for English constituencies
UK MPs 1802–1806
UK MPs 1806–1807
UK MPs 1807–1812
UK MPs 1812–1818
UK MPs 1818–1820
UK MPs 1820–1826
UK MPs 1826–1830
UK MPs 1830–1831
People from Warwickshire